Vacuolar protein sorting-associated protein 13D is a protein that in humans is encoded by the VPS13D gene.

This gene encodes a protein belonging to the vacuolar-protein-sorting-13 gene family. In yeast, vacuolar-protein-sorting-13 proteins are involved in trafficking of membrane proteins between the trans-Golgi network and the prevacuolar compartment. 

While several transcript variants may exist for this gene, the full-length natures of only two have been described to date. These two represent the major variants of this gene and encode distinct isoforms.

References

Further reading